Wright Township may refer to:

In Canada
 Wright Township, in Cochrane District, Ontario

In the United States

Indiana
 Wright Township, Greene County, Indiana

Iowa
 Wright Township, Pottawattamie County, Iowa
 Wright Township, Wayne County, Iowa

Michigan
 Wright Township, Hillsdale County, Michigan
 Wright Township, Ottawa County, Michigan

Minnesota
 Wright Township, Marshall County, Minnesota

North Dakota
 Wright Township, Dickey County, North Dakota

Oklahoma
 Wright Township, Jefferson County, Oklahoma

Pennsylvania
 Wright Township, Luzerne County, Pennsylvania

South Dakota
 Wright Township, Tripp County, South Dakota, in Tripp County, South Dakota

See also
Wright (disambiguation)

Township name disambiguation pages